This is a list of notable people associated with Brasenose College, Oxford.  Some individuals fall into several categories. They are sorted alphabetically by surname.

This list of notable alumni consists predominantly of men, due to the fact that women first studied at Brasenose as undergraduates in 1974, the college being among the first to go mixed at this point.

Alumni 
See also Former students of Brasenose College, Oxford.

Politicians and civil servants

 Sir Donald Acheson, Chief Medical Officer of the United Kingdom (1983–1991)
 Henry Addington, 1st Viscount Sidmouth Prime Minister of the United Kingdom (1801–1804)
 Sir Tim Barrow, Permanent Representative of the United Kingdom to the European Union
 Mamoun Beheiry, former Sudanese finance minister and governor of the Central Bank of Sudan
 John Brademas, American politician and educator
 John Buchan, 1st Baron Tweedsmuir, Scottish novelist, historian and Unionist politician who served as Governor General of Canada
 David Cameron, Prime Minister of the United Kingdom
 Camilla Cavendish, Baroness Cavendish of Little Venice
 Pete Dawkins, Rhodes Scholar, U.S. Army brigadier general, and Republican candidate for Senate
 Stephen Dorrell, British Conservative politician
 John Gorton, Prime Minister of Australia
 Mark Harper, British politician 
 Tanvir Ahmad Khan, former Foreign Secretary of Pakistan
 Bill O'Chee, Australian politician
 Amin Osman, Egyptian politician
 John Profumo, British politician
 Malcolm Turnbull, Prime Minister of Australia

Judges and lawyers

 Charles Onyeama, Justice of the Nigerian Supreme Court (1964–67), Judge on the International Court of Justice (1967–76)
 George Baker,  President of the Family Division (formerly of the Probate, Divorce and Admiralty Division) of the High Court of Justice, 1971–1979
 Jack Beatson, Lord Justice of Appeal
 Thomas Egerton, 1st Viscount Brackley English nobleman, judge and statesman who served as Lord Keeper and Lord Chancellor
 William Robert Grove, Welsh judge and physical scientist
 William Hulme, 17th-century lawyer and landowner
 Kris Kobach, 31st Secretary of State of Kansas and Republican candidate in the state's 2018 gubernatorial election
 Anthony McCowan, British barrister and judge of the High Court of Justice and Court of Appeal 
 Jeremy McMullen, barrister, judge, trade unionist and expert on employment law
 John Mortimer, British barrister, dramatist, screenwriter and author
 John Port, judge
 Leslie Scarman, Baron Scarman, English judge and barrister
 Sir John McIntosh Young AC KCMG, Chief Justice of Victoria (1974-1991)

Clergy
 Richard Barnes, bishop in the Church of England (1567–1579)
 William Webb Ellis, Anglican clergyman; allegedly the inventor of rugby football whilst a pupil at Rugby School
 The Rt Revd Gordon Mursell, Bishop of Stafford
 George Nichols (martyr), martyr
 Robert Runcie, Archbishop of Canterbury, 1980—1991
 Dom Illtyd Trethowan, English priest, philosopher and author
 The Very Reverend Henry Wace, principal of King's College London (1883–1897) and Dean of Canterbury (1903–1924)

Military personnel
 Douglas Haig, 1st Earl Haig, field marshal, British senior officer during World War I
 Michelle D. Johnson, first female superintendent of the United States Air Force Academy
 Charles Herbert Little, Canadian Director of Naval Intelligence during the Second World War; author

Classicists and archaeologists
 Arthur Evans, British archaeologist

Historians and antiquarians

 Elias Ashmole, antiquary, politician, officer of arms, astrologer and student of alchemy
 Colin B. Bailey, art historian
 Rev. Wladislaw Somerville Lach-Szyrma, historian (folklore) and science fiction
 Robert O'Neill, military theorist and historian
 Tudor Parfitt, historian, orientalist and writer
 John Robert Martindale, historian, specializing in Roman and Byzantine prosopography

Language and literature academics
 Robert Burton, scholar at Oxford University
 Francis Pott, Classical languages scholar and Anglican hymnwriter

Philosophers and theologians
 John Foxe, English historian and martyrologist
 Alexander Nowell, Anglican Puritan theologian and clergyman, served as dean of St Paul's 
 David Pearce, Utilitarian philosopher, founder of the World Transhumanist Association
 Thomas Traherne, English poet, clergyman, theologian, and religious writer
 Dom Illtyd Trethowan, English priest, philosopher and author
 William Whittingham, English Biblical scholar and religious reformer, dean of Durham

Mathematicians, medics and scientists

 Colin Clark, economist and statistician
 Paul Frampton, particle phenomenologist
 William Robert Grove, Welsh judge and physical scientist
 Michael Kosterlitz, Nobel Prize in Physics laureate
 Professor Graham Richards, head of chemistry at the University of Oxford  (1997–2006)
 Sir Michael Stratton, third director of the Wellcome Trust Sanger Institute; currently heads the Cancer Genome Project
 Sir Thomas Taylor, chemist and academic administrator

Educators 
 Frank Aydelotte, U.S. educator
 Keith Ingram, former Dragon School headmaster
 Robert Lindgren, president of Randolph-Macon College
 Tim Peto, professor of medicine at the University of Oxford

Artists and writers

 Richard Barham, English cleric of the Church of England, novelist, and humorous poet
 John Buchan, 1st Baron Tweedsmuir, Scottish novelist, historian and Unionist politician, served as Governor General of Canada
 Jessie Burton, author and actress
 Helen DeWitt, novelist
 J. G. Farrell, novelist 
 Michael Freeman
 William Golding, English novelist, poet, playwright and Nobel Prize in Literature laureate
 Tim Harford, economist and journalist
 David Langford, science fiction writer
 John Marston
 Simon Mawer, English writer 
 Grace McCleen, novelist
 George Monbiot, English writer
 Sir John Mortimer, British barrister, dramatist, screenwriter and author
 Rev. James Noyes, Puritan scholar and author; founder of Newbury, Massachusetts
 Rolfe Arnold Scott-James, literary critic
Sarah Vaughan, writer and journalist
 William Edward Vickers (Roy Vickers), English mystery writer
 Sara Wheeler, English travel writer and biographer
 Toby Young, British journalist

Broadcasters and entertainers

 Wilton Barnhardt, former reporter for Sports Illustrated; author
 Laura Corcoran, member of musical comedy cabaret double act
 Michael Palin, comedian, actor, writer and television presenter
 Mark Williams, actor

Musicians
 Mylo (Myles MacInnes), Scottish electronic musician and record producer

Sports people

 Brian Boobbyer, rugby union and cricketer
 John Cherry, rower who competed at the 1936 Summer Olympics
 Colin Cowdrey, cricketer
 William Webb Ellis, Anglican clergyman; allegedly the inventor of rugby football whilst a pupil at Rugby School
 Tom Edwards-Moss, rower who competed in the Boat Race four times and twice won the Diamond Challenge Sculls; later a Conservative politician
 James Fulton, cricketer
 Arnold Jackson, British athlete 1912 Olympic 1500m gold medallist, Army Officer (DSO with Three Bars) and barrister
 Prince Alexander Obolensky, represented England in International Rugby Union
 Cuthbert Ottaway, first captain of the England football team
 Edward Shaw, cricketer and British Army officer
 Walter Bradford Woodgate, Boat Race winner and multiple-time Henley Royal Regatta champion

Other people in public life 
 Kate Allen, Director of Amnesty International UK (AIUK)
 Mamoun Beheiry, economist, first commissioner of the Bank of Sudan and first president of the African Development Bank
 Andrew Feldman, Baron Feldman of Elstree
 Camilla Cavendish, Baroness Cavendish of Little Venice
 Denys Finch Hatton, aristocratic big-game hunter
 Robin Janvrin, Baron Janvrin, Private Secretary to Queen Elizabeth II (1999—2007)
 Bruce Kent, British political activist and former Roman Catholic priest
 Andrew Lindsay, former Olympic gold medal-winning rower at the 2000 Summer Olympics and CEO of Telecom Plus
 Philip Moore, Baron Moore of Wolvercote, Private Secretary to the Sovereign (1977–1986)
 Paul Pester, CEO of TSB Bank
 Amanda Pullinger, Philanthropist
 Guy Spier, Investor
 Philip Yea, British businessman and private equity investor
 Christopher Kong, CEO of Better Nature Tempeh

Fellows and Principals 

 J. L. Ackrill, Emeritus Professor of the History of Philosophy 
 Richard Adams, theologian
 The Rev. Thomas Adams, English academic and theological writer
 John Anderson, Camden Professor of Ancient History (1927–1936)
 Konstantin Ardakov, mathematician
 John Barnard, supporter of James II of England
 Richard Barnes, Bishop in the Church of England (1567–1579)
 John Barnston, divine
 Llewellyn John Montfort Bebb, British academic, Principal of St David's College (1898–1915)
 The Rt. Rev. James Bell, Bishop of Knaresborough
 Bryan John Birch, British mathematician
 Peter Birks, Regius Professor of Civil Law
 Vernon Bogdanor, Research Professor at the Institute for Contemporary British History at King's College London
 Robert Bolton, clergyman and academic
 The Rt. Hon. George Bowen, British author and colonial administrator
 Gerard Baldwin Brown, art historian
 Peter Brunt, ancient historian at Oxford University
 Arthur Chandler, Bishop of Bloemfontein, Chaplin
 Ralph Churton, churchman
 Richard Cooper, Professor of French at the Faculty of Medieval and Modern Languages, University of Oxford
 Jonathan Culler, Professor of English at Cornell University
 George Edmundson, clergyman and academic historian
 Sos Eltis, Fellow and tutor in English of Brasenose College, author
 Russell G. Foster, Professor of Circadian Neuroscience

 John Foxe, English historian and martyrologist
 John Freeman, retired British politician, diplomat and broadcaster
 James Garbett, Archdeacon of Chichester
 Reginald Halse, Archbishop of Brisbane
 Francis J. Haverfield, British historian and archaeologist
 Douglas Higgs, researcher at the Weatherall Institute of Molecular Medicine at the University of Oxford 
 Jonathan A. Jones, University lecturer in atomic and laser physics at Oxford University 
 Kurt Josten, curator of the Museum of the History of Science, Oxford
 Harry Judge, Senior Research Fellow at the Department of Education

 Otto Kahn-Freund, professor of comparative law, University of Oxford
 Nicholas Kurti, physicist 
 Falconer Madan, librarian of the Bodleian Library
 Fergus Millar, British historian and Camden Professor of Ancient History 
 Reginald Owen, Archbishop of New Zealand (1952—1960)
 Simon Palfrey, English scholar at Oxford University 
 Walter Pater, English essayist, critic of art and literature, and writer of fiction
 Henry Francis Pelham, English scholar and historian
 William Petty, English economist, scientist and philosopher
 Edward Hayes Plumptre, English divine and scholar 
 Leighton Durham Reynolds, British classicist and Emeritus Professor of Classical Languages and Literature
 Samuel Harvey Reynolds, divine
 Graham Richards, Head of Chemistry (1997–2006) at the University of Oxford
 Gareth Roberts, Welsh physicist
 Arthur William Rucker, physicist

 Simon Schama, British historian and art historian
 Robert Shackleton, English French language philologist and librarian
 Peter J. N. Sinclair, Professor in Economics at the University of Birmingham
 Richard V. Southwell, British mathematician
 Ronald Syme, historian and classicist
 D. R. Thorpe, biographer of three British Prime Ministers
 John Wain, former Professor of Poetry, Oxford
 Thomas Humphry Ward, English author and journalist
 Geoffrey Warnock, philosopher and Vice-Chancellor 
 Lawrence Washington, English rector
 Francis Willis, physician and clergyman
 The Rt. Rev. John Wordsworth, English prelate

Principals

The current principal is John Bowers.

Honorary Fellows 

 Donald Acheson, Chief Medical Officer of the United Kingdom (1983–1991)
 Kate Allen, Director of Amnesty International UK (AIUK)
 George Baker,  President of the Family Division (formerly of the Probate, Divorce and Admiralty Division) of the High Court of Justice
 Dominic Barton, Ugandan-born Canadian management consultant
 John Brademas, Greek American politician and educator
 David Cameron, Prime Minister of the United Kingdom
 John Gorton, Prime Minister of Australia
 Erwin Hahn, American physicist, Wolf Prize in Physics (1983/4)
 Catharine Bond Hill, former president of Vassar College
 Robin Janvrin, Baron Janvrin, Private Secretary to Queen Elizabeth II (February 1999 to September 2007)
 Michelle D. Johnson, Lieutenant General in the United States Air Force and Superintendent of the United States Air Force Academy
 Bruce Kent, British political activist
 John Mortimer, English barrister, dramatist, screenwriter and author
 Michael Palin, comedian, actor, writer and television presenter
 Leslie Scarman, Baron Scarman
 Francis James Wylie, first Warden of Rhodes House

Other persons associated with Brasenose 
 Jeffrey Archer
 Eleanor Parker,  British historian and medievalist.

References 

Brasenose College
People associated with Brasenose College, Oxford